Petunia is a 2012 comedy-drama film. It was co-written and directed by Ash Christian.  Thora Birch, who stars in the film, and her father Jack Birch, are credited as producers.

Plot
The film relates simultaneously the lives and romantic/sexual relationships of the Petunias: the parents, Felicia and Percy, and their three sons, Michael, Adrian and Charlie. The film also features the wife of Michael, Vivian, and her cousin George.

Cast
Tobias Segal as Charlie Petunia
Thora Birch as Vivian Petunia
Christine Lahti as Felicia Petunia
Brittany Snow as Robin McDougal
Michael Urie as George McDougal
David Rasche as Percy Petunia
Eddie Kaye Thomas as Michael Petunia
Jimmy Heck as Adrian Petunia
Branca Ferrazo as Natassia
Shad Gaspard as XL

Reception
Due to its very limited release, the film has been reviewed by few outlets. Reception for the film has generally been mixed. Frank Scheck from The Hollywood Reporter weighs, in a lukewarm review, a "wildly inconsistent" plot against "some marvelous moments and a terrific ensemble". Dennis Harvey in Variety compares the film to director Todd Solondz's works, judging Petunia to have "a bit less bile (and punch)".

References

External links

2012 films
2012 comedy-drama films
American comedy-drama films
Films set in New York (state)
2010s English-language films
2010s American films